Marco Mengoni Live is the second live album by Italian recording artist Marco Mengoni, released on 25 November 2016 and also featuring 5 previously unreleased studio tracks.
The album was preceded by the single "Sai che", released on 14 October 2016.
Marco Mengoni Live is the last chapter of Mengoni's project Parole in circolo, which also included the studio albums Parole in circolo and Le cose che non ho, both released in 2015.

The album debuted at number one on the Italian Albums Chart, and it was later certified platinum by the Federation of the Italian Music Industry.

Track listing

Charts

Certifications

References

External links
 Marco Mengoni Live at Allmusic

2016 live albums
Marco Mengoni albums
Italian-language live albums